Adam Morgan (born 28 October 1981) is a former Australian rules footballer who played in the Australian Football League (AFL).

AFL career

Port Adelaide career (2002–2003)
Overlooking the chance to recruit Brendan Fevola, Port Adelaide opted for Morgan in the 1998 National Draft. After only playing two seasons at Port, he was traded to the Western Bulldogs 2003 trade period. He had only managed to play three senior games at Port.

Western Bulldogs career (2004–2006)
He was recruited by the Western Bulldogs as a key position player that could play in the forward line or defence, but following two successive season ending injuries in 2005 and 2006, Morgan was delisted by the Bulldogs at the end of the 2006 season.

External links

Western Bulldogs players
Port Adelaide Football Club players
Port Adelaide Football Club players (all competitions)
1981 births
Living people
Australian rules footballers from Victoria (Australia)
Oakleigh Chargers players